James Duckworth was the defending champion but lost in the second round to Miljan Zekić.

Max Purcell won the title after defeating Luca Nardi 6–2, 6–3 in the final.

Seeds

Draw

Finals

Top half

Bottom half

References

External links
Main draw
Qualifying draw

Pune Challenger - 1
2023 Singles